Sherborne St John is a village and civil parish near Basingstoke in the English county of Hampshire.

History
The village was named in the Domesday book as Sireburne. It became Shireburna (12th century), Schyreburne (13th century) and Shirebourne Decani, Shireburn St. John in the 14th century.

Sir Bernard Brocas, the 14th century soldier and friend of the Black Prince, held the Beaurepaire estate in Sherborne St John. His son, the rebel, also called Sir Bernard Brocas, made it the family's permanent home.

Governance
The village of Sherborne St John is a civil parish with a parish council and ward of Basingstoke and Deane borough council. The borough council is a Non-metropolitan district of Hampshire County Council and all three councils are responsible for different aspects of local government.

Geography

Culture and community
The following can be found in the village: The Swan pub, Sherborne St John Social Club (established 1903 and oldest registered club in the country), Sherborne St. John Village Hall (and clock), Sherborne St. John Tennis Club, St. Andrews Church, Sherborne St John FC, 1 duck pond, 2 swing parks, Chute Pavilion and Sports Field, Sherborne St. John Toddlers, and a village green.

Sherborne St. John has its own parish magazine, The Villager. A Greening Campaign has been launched to make all the locals eco friendly.

Annual events in the parish include the Sherborne St John Village Fayre and Monk Sherborne & District Horticultural Show.

Landmarks
Sherborne is the location of two well-known country estates:
 The Vyne is a 16th-century country house, built by William, Lord Sandys, later the home of the Chute family and now owned by the National Trust.
 Beaurepaire, formerly a Tudor mansion, was almost entirely rebuilt after a fire in Victorian times. It was the home of the Brocas family for many centuries from the time of Sir Bernard Brocas, the hero of Crécy.

Education
The Sherborne St. John Church of England Primary School is over 150 years old and teaches year R (Reception) and years 1–6.  The school has approximately 17 children in each year, and approximately 115 students in total.  In the SATS results of 2010 the school placed as the top primary school in Hampshire (based on Average Points Score).

Children aged 11 to 16 that receive state-funded education are likely to attend The Hurst School in Baughurst.

See also
 List of places in Hampshire
 List of civil parishes in Hampshire

References

External links

 Sherborne St John Parish Council
 Sherbornes with Pamber Church (C of E)
 Sherborne St. John Church of England Primary School

Villages in Hampshire
Civil parishes in Basingstoke and Deane